= Muslim Raibhat =

Muslim community in North India

The Muslim Raibhat or Raibhaat are a Muslim community found in North India. They are also known as Bhaat.
